Leslie Albert "Len" Johnson (6 July 1908 – 24 January 1942) was an Australian rules footballer who played with Essendon and North Melbourne in the Victorian Football League (VFL). He died in an accident while serving with the Second AIF during World War II.

Family
One of the eight children of Albert Henry Johnson, and Margaret Johnson, née O'Keefe, Leslie Albert Johnson was born in Elsternwick, Victoria on 6 July 1908 (his birth was registered as "Albert Lesley Johnson").

SVP Boys Orphanage
His mother died on 26 June 1918, aged 40, when Len was only 10. His father, a handyman who had to travel widely for his work, leaving his youngest son in the hands of his daughters, and assuming that his eldest son, Dan (known as Edward), could look after himself, and delivered his three other sons, Len, Eric, and Patrick over to the Society of Saint Vincent de Paul's Boys Orphanage in Cecil Street, South Melbourne.<ref>Former St Vincent de Paul Boys Orphanage, Heritage Council of Victoria.</ref>

Football
He was equal leading goalkicker for Essendon in the 1929 VFL season, and in one game kicked nine goals. He then played and coached in Tasmania, including at the Longford, Nhill and Griffith clubs.

Military service
Johnson enlisted in the Second AIF in March 1941 and was posted to British Malaya as a private in 4 Reserve Motor Transport Company.

Death
He died in an accident on 24 January 1942 near Singapore. On that day, Johnson's sergeant ordered 4 Reserve Motor Transport Company to demolish a warehouse. The sergeant knocked down a wall, not knowing that Johnson was behind it and killing Johnson in the process.Footballer's Death, The Argus, (Wednesday, 28 January 1942), p.4.L.A. Johnson Killed: On Active Service, The Mercury, (Thursday, 29 January 1942), p.8. 

Grave
The location of his grave was lost when the Japanese Empire occupied Singapore three weeks after Johnson's death.

Commemorated
His death is commemorated at the Singapore War Memorial, Kranji.

See also
 List of Victorian Football League players who died on active service

Footnotes

References
 World War Two Nominal Roll: Private Leslie Albert Johnson (VX50877), at Department of Veterans' Affairs.
 Holmesby, Russell & Main, Jim (2002), The Encyclopedia of AFL Footballers: every AFL/VFL player since 1897 (4th ed.), Melbourne, Victoria: Crown Content. p. 328. .
 Main, J. & Allen, D., "Johnson, Len", pp.270-272 in Main, J. & Allen, D., Fallen – The Ultimate Heroes: Footballers Who Never Returned From War, Crown Content, (Melbourne), 2002. 
 Maplestone, M., Flying Higher: History of the Essendon Football Club 1872–1996, Essendon Football Club, (Melbourne), 1996. 

External links
 
 
 Len Johnson, at The VFA Project.
 Len Johnson, at Boyles Football Photos''.

1908 births
1942 deaths
Australian rules footballers from Melbourne
Essendon Football Club players
North Melbourne Football Club players
Nhill Football Club players
Port Melbourne Football Club players
Longford Football Club players
Australian military personnel killed in World War II
Australian Army personnel of World War II
Australian Army soldiers
Accidental deaths in Singapore
People from Elsternwick, Victoria
Military personnel from Melbourne